Renfrew Museum may refer to:

Renfrew Museum and Park in Waynesboro, Pennsylvania
Renfrew Community Museum in Renfrew, Scotland
McDougall Mill Museum (informally referred to as Renfrew Museum) in Renfrew, Ontario

See also
Renfrew